The Yongcheng Theater is a theater in Yanshuei District, Tainan, Taiwan.

History
The theater building was originally constructed as the Yongcheng Rice Mill during the Japanese rule of Taiwan. At that time, the business flourished with an extensive networks among government officials and merchants. After the end of World War II and the handover of Taiwan from Japan to the Republic of China in 1945, the business declined and the mill ceased from operation.

The mill was then turned into a theater and was opened in the same year. It then became a meeting point for people around the Yanshuei area. It showed movies, films and even sometimes theater troupes. Nevertheless, the theater went out of business in 2000. Later on, the Tainan City Government renovated the theater and it was opened again for movie showing.

Architecture
The theater features some art installations around the building.

Events
The theater was part of the Yue Jin Lantern Festival 2017 venue for movie screening locations.

See also
 Cinema of Taiwan

References

1945 establishments in Taiwan
Buildings and structures in Tainan
Theatres completed in 1945
Theatres in Taiwan